Zodiac is a 2007 American drama thriller film directed by David Fincher from a screenplay by James Vanderbilt, based on the non-fiction books by Robert Graysmith, Zodiac (1986) and Zodiac Unmasked (2002). The film stars Jake Gyllenhaal, Mark Ruffalo, and Robert Downey Jr. with Anthony Edwards, Brian Cox, Elias Koteas, Donal Logue, John Carroll Lynch, Chloë Sevigny, Philip Baker Hall and Dermot Mulroney in supporting roles.

The film tells the story of the manhunt for the Zodiac Killer, a serial murderer who terrorized the San Francisco Bay Area during the late 1960s and early 1970s, taunting police with letters, bloodstained clothing, and ciphers mailed to newspapers. The case remains one of the United States' most infamous unsolved crimes. Fincher, Vanderbilt, and producer Bradley J. Fischer spent 18 months conducting their own investigation and research into the Zodiac murders. Fincher employed the digital Thomson Viper FilmStream Camera to photograph most of the film, with traditional high-speed film cameras used for slow-motion murder sequences.

Zodiac was released by Paramount Pictures in North America and Warner Bros. Pictures in international markets on March 2, 2007, and received largely positive reviews, with praise for its writing, directing, acting, and historical accuracy. The film was nominated for several awards, including the Saturn Award for Best Action, Adventure or Thriller Film. It grossed over $84.7 million worldwide on a production budget of $65 million. In a 2016 critics' poll conducted by the BBC, Zodiac was voted the 12th greatest film of the 21st century.

Plot

On July 4, 1969, an unknown man attacks Darlene Ferrin and Mike Mageau with a handgun at a lovers' lane in Vallejo, California. Only Mike survives.

One month later, the San Francisco Chronicle receives encrypted letters written by the killer calling himself "Zodiac," who threatens to kill a dozen people unless his coded message containing his identity is published. Political cartoonist Robert Graysmith, who correctly guesses that his identity is not in the message, is not taken seriously by crime reporter Paul Avery or the editors and is excluded from the initial details about the killings. When the newspaper publishes the letters, a married couple deciphers one. In September, the killer stabs law student Bryan Hartnell and Cecelia Shepard at Lake Berryessa in Napa County; Cecelia dies two days later.

At the office, Avery makes fun of Graysmith before they discuss the coded letters. Graysmith interprets the letter, which Avery finds helpful, and he begins sharing information. One of Graysmith's insights about the letters is that Zodiac's reference to man as "the most dangerous animal of them all" is a reference to the film The Most Dangerous Game, which features the villainous Count Zaroff, a man who hunts live human prey.

Two weeks later, San Francisco taxicab driver Paul Stine is shot and killed in the city's Presidio Heights district. The Zodiac killer mails pieces of Stine's bloodstained shirt to the Chronicle along with a taunting letter. San Francisco police inspectors Dave Toschi and his partner Bill Armstrong are assigned to the case by Captain Marty Lee and work closely with Vallejo's Jack Mulanax and Captain Ken Narlow in Napa. Someone claiming to be Zodiac continues to send taunting letters and speaks on the phone with lawyer Melvin Belli on the KGO-TV morning talk show hosted by Jim Dunbar.

In 1971, Detectives Toschi, Armstrong, and Mulanax question Arthur Leigh Allen, a suspect in the Vallejo case. They notice that he wears a Zodiac wristwatch, with the same logo used by the killer, and Toschi heavily suspects him. However, a handwriting expert insists that Allen did not write the Zodiac letters, even though Allen is said to be ambidextrous. Avery receives a letter threatening his life; becoming paranoid, he turns to drugs and alcohol. He shares information with the Riverside Police Department that the killer might have been active before the initial killings, angering Toschi and Armstrong. The case's notoriety weighs on Toschi, who cannot sit through a Hollywood film, Dirty Harry, loosely based on the Zodiac case.

By 1978, Avery has moved to the Sacramento Bee. Graysmith persistently contacts Toschi about the Zodiac murders and eventually impresses him with his knowledge of the case. While Toschi cannot directly give Graysmith access to the evidence, he provides names in other police departments where Zodiac murders occurred. Armstrong transfers from the San Francisco Police homicide division, and Toschi is demoted for supposedly forging a Zodiac letter.

Graysmith continues his own investigation, profiled in the Chronicle, and gives a television interview about the book he is writing about the case. He begins receiving phone calls with heavy breathing. As his obsession deepens, Graysmith loses his job, and his wife Melanie leaves him, taking their children. Graysmith learns that Allen lived close to Ferrin and probably knew her and that his birthday matches the one Zodiac gave when he spoke to one of Melvin Belli's maids. While circumstantial evidence seems to indicate his guilt, the physical evidence, such as fingerprints and handwriting samples, do not implicate him. In 1983, Graysmith tracks Allen to a Vallejo Ace Hardware store, where he is employed as a sales clerk; they stare at each other before Graysmith leaves. Eight years later, after Graysmith's book, Zodiac, has become a bestseller, Mike Mageau identifies Allen from a police mugshot.

A textual epilogue indicates that Allen died before police could question him and that the case remains open.

Cast 

 Jake Gyllenhaal as Robert Graysmith
 Mark Ruffalo as Inspector Dave Toschi
 Robert Downey Jr. as Paul Avery
 Anthony Edwards as Inspector Bill Armstrong
 Brian Cox as Melvin Belli
 Elias Koteas as Sergeant Jack Mulanax
 Donal Logue as Captain Ken Narlow
 John Carroll Lynch as Arthur Leigh Allen
 Dermot Mulroney as Captain Marty Lee
 Chloë Sevigny as Melanie Graysmith
 John Terry as Charles Thieriot
 Philip Baker Hall as Sherwood Morrill
 June Diane Raphael as Carol Toschi
 Ciara Moriarty as Darlene Ferrin
 Adam Goldberg as Duffy Jennings
 Tom Verica as Jim Dunbar
 Lee Norris as Mike Mageau
Jimmi Simpson as Older Mike Mageau
 Zach Grenier as Mel Nicolai
 Joel Bissonnette as Inspector Kracke
 James LeGros as Detective George Bawart
 John Getz as Templeton Peck
 John Mahon as Captain Gillette
 Matt Winston as John Allen
 Jules Bruff as Catherine Allen
 John Ennis as Terry Pascoe
 Patrick Scott Lewis as Bryan Hartnell
 Pell James as Cecilia Shepard
 Charles Fleischer as Bob Vaughn
 Clea DuVall as Linda del Buono
 Zachary Sauers as Aaron Graysmith
 Micah Sauers as David Graysmith 
 Paul Schulze as Sandy Panzarella
 John Hemphill as Donald Cheney
 Ed Setrakian as Al Hyman
 Richmond Arquette as Zodiac 1 / Zodiac 2
 Bob Stephenson as Zodiac 3
 John Lacy	as Zodiac 4
 Ione Skye as Kathleen Johns (uncredited)

Production

Development
Robert Graysmith first sold the film rights to his true crime book Zodiac to Shane Salerno, who he had built up a close relationship with. Salerno managed to make a deal with Ricardo Mestres of Great Oaks Entertainment to co-produce and write the film for Touchstone Pictures. According to Stuart Hazeldine, who was pitched to rewrite, the script would've been about the Zodiac killer resurfacing in Los Angeles.

James Vanderbilt had read Robert Graysmith's book Zodiac while in high school. Years later, after becoming a screenwriter, he got the opportunity to meet Graysmith, and became fascinated by the folklore surrounding the Zodiac killer. He decided to try to translate the story into a script. Vanderbilt had endured bad experiences in the past in which the endings of his scripts had been changed, and wanted to have more control over the material this time. He pitched his adaptation of Zodiac to Mike Medavoy and Bradley J. Fischer from Phoenix Pictures, agreeing to write a spec script if he could have more creative control over it.

Graysmith met Fischer and Vanderbilt at the premiere of Paul Schrader's film Auto Focus, based on Graysmith's 1991 book about the life and death of actor Bob Crane. A deal was made and they optioned the rights to Zodiac and Zodiac Unmasked when they became available after languishing at another studio for nearly a decade. David Fincher was their first choice to direct based on his work on Seven. Originally, he was going to direct an adaptation of James Ellroy's novel The Black Dahlia (later filmed by Brian De Palma), and envisioned a five-hour, $80 million mini-series with film stars. When that failed to materialize, Fincher left that project and moved on to Zodiac.

For the young Fincher, he was drawn to the Zodiac story because he spent much of his childhood in San Anselmo in Marin County during the initial murders; he thought the killer "was the ultimate boogeyman". The director was also drawn to the unresolved ending of Vanderbilt's screenplay because it felt true to real life, as cases are not always solved. Fincher felt his job was to dispel the enduring mythic stature of the case by clearly defining what was fact and what was fiction. He told Vanderbilt that he wanted the screenplay rewritten with research done from the original police reports. Fincher found that there was much speculation and hearsay and, therefore, wanted to interview people who were directly involved in the case in-person to see if their stories were believable. He did this because he felt a burden of responsibility in making a film that convicted someone posthumously.

Fincher, Fischer and Vanderbilt spent months interviewing witnesses, family members of suspects, retired and current investigators, the two surviving victims, and the mayors of San Francisco and Vallejo. Fincher said, "Even when we did our own interviews, we would talk to two people. One would confirm some aspects of it and another would deny it. Plus, so much time had passed, memories are affected and the different telling of the stories would change perception. So when there was any doubt we always went with the police reports." During the course of their research, Fincher and Fischer hired Gerald McMenamin, a forensic linguistics expert and professor of linguistics at California State University Fresno, to analyze the Zodiac's letters. Unlike document examiners in the 1970s, he focused on the language of the Zodiac and how he formed his sentences in terms of structure and spelling.Fincher and Fischer approached Metro-Goldwyn-Mayer to finance the film but talks fell through because the studio wanted the running time fixed at two hours and fifteen minutes. Warner Bros. and Paramount Pictures agreed to share the production costs and were more flexible about the running time. The executives were concerned about the large amount of dialogue, lack of action scenes, and inconclusive ending. When Dave Toschi met Fincher, Fischer and Vanderbilt, Fincher told him that he was not going to make another Dirty Harry (which is loosely based on the Zodiac case). Toschi was impressed with their knowledge of the case and realized that he had learned from them. Toschi watched Zodiac several times and said "I thought Ruffalo did a good job," but also that the film reminded him of old frustrations that the case was never closed. The Zodiac's surviving victims, Mike Mageau and Bryan Hartnell, were consultants on the film.

Alan J. Pakula's film All the President's Men was the template for Zodiac as Fincher felt that it was also "the story of a reporter determined to get the story at any cost and one who was new to being an investigative reporter. It was all about his obsession to know the truth." Like in that film, he did not want to spend time telling the back story of any of the characters, focusing, instead, on what they did in regards to the case." Vanderbilt was drawn to the notion that Graysmith went from a cartoonist to one of the most significant investigators of the case. He pitched the story as: "What if Garry Trudeau woke up one morning and tried to solve the Son of Sam"? As he worked on the script, he became friends with Graysmith. The filmmakers secured the cooperation of the Vallejo Police Department (one of the key investigators at the time) because they hoped that the film would inspire someone to come forward with information that might help solve the cold case.

Casting

One of Fincher's earliest conversations on the film's casting was with Jennifer Aniston. She talked about actors she had enjoyed working with; they were Gyllenhaal (The Good Girl) and Mark Ruffalo (Rumor Has It). While researching the film, Fincher considered Jake Gyllenhaal to play Robert Graysmith. According to the director, "I really liked him in Donnie Darko and I thought, 'He's an interesting double-sided coin. He can do that naive thing but he can also do possessed.'" In preparation for his role Gyllenhaal met Graysmith, and videotaped him to study his mannerisms and behavior.

Initially, Mark Ruffalo was not interested in the project but Fincher wanted him to play David Toschi. He met with the actor and told him that he was rewriting the screenplay. "I loved what he was saying and loved where he was going with it", the actor remembers. For research, he read every report on the case and read all the books on the subject. Ruffalo met Toschi and found out that he had "perfect recall of the details and what happened when, where, who was there, what he was wearing. He always knew what he was wearing. I think it is seared into who he is and it was a big deal for him."

Fincher thought of Anthony Edwards for the role of Inspector William Armstrong, saying "I knew I needed the most decent person I could find, because he would be the balance of the movie. In a weird way, this movie wouldn't exist without Bill Armstrong. Everything we know about the Zodiac case, we know because of his notes. So in casting the part, I wanted to get someone who is totally reliable." Originally, Gary Oldman was to play Melvin Belli but "he went to a lot of trouble, they had appliances, but just physically it wasn't going to work, he just didn't have the girth", Graysmith said. Brian Cox was cast instead. Lee Norris played the 1969 Mike Mageau, and Jimmi Simpson played the character's older version.

Principal photography
Fincher decided to use the digital Thomson Viper FilmStream Camera to shoot the film. He had previously used the Thomson Viper over the past three years on commercials for Nike, Hewlett Packard, Heineken and Lexus, which allowed him to get used to and experiment with the equipment. He was able to use inexpensive desktop software like Final Cut Pro to edit Zodiac. Fincher remarked in an interview, "Dailies almost always end up being disappointing, like the veil is pierced and you look at it for the first time and think, 'Oh my god, this is what I really have to work with.' But when you can see what you have as it's gathered, it can be a much less neurotic process."

Contrary to belief, Zodiac was not shot entirely digitally. Traditional high-speed film cameras were used for slow-motion murder sequences. Michael Mann's Miami Vice, as well as his previous effort, Collateral (a co-production of Paramount and its current sister studio DreamWorks, and which also starred Mark Ruffalo), were also shot with the camera but mixed in other formats. Once shot on the Viper camera, the files were converted to DVCPro HD 1080i and edited in Final Cut Pro. This was for editorial decisions only. During the later stages of editing the original uncompressed 1080p 4:4:4 RAW digital source footage was assembled automatically to maintain an up-to-date digital "negative" of the film. Other digital productions like Superman Returns or Apocalypto recorded to the HDCAM tape format.

Fincher had previously worked with director of photography Harris Savides on Seven (he shot the opening credits) and The Game. Savides loved the script but realized, "there was so much exposition, just people talking on the phone or having conversations. It was difficult to imagine how it could be done in a visual way." Fincher and Savides did not want to repeat the look of Seven. The director's approach to Zodiac was to create a look mundane enough that audiences would accept that what they were watching was the truth. The filmmakers also did not want to glamorize the killer or tell the story through his eyes. "That would have turned the story into a first-person-shooter video game. We didn't want to make the sort of movie that serial killers would want to own," Fincher said.

Savides' first experience with the Viper Filmstream camera was shooting a Motorola commercial with Fincher. From there, he used it on Zodiac. Fincher wanted to make sure that the camera was more inclined towards film production so that the studio would be more comfortable about using it on a project with a large budget. To familiarize himself with the camera, he "did as many things 'wrong' as I possibly could. I went against everything I was supposed to do with the camera." Savides felt comfortable with the camera despite its certain limitations.

Fincher and Savides used the photographs of William Eggleston, Stephen Shore's work from the early Seventies, and actual photos from the Zodiac police files. The two men worked hard to capture the look and feel of the period as Fincher admitted, "I suppose there could have been more VW bugs but I think what we show is a pretty good representation of the time. It is not technically perfect. There are some flaws but some are intended." The San Francisco Chronicle was built in the old post office in the Terminal Annex Building in downtown Los Angeles. A building on nearby Spring Street subbed for the Hall of Justice and the San Francisco Police Department. Principal photography began on September 12, 2005. The filmmakers shot for five weeks in the San Francisco Bay Area and the rest of the time in Los Angeles, bringing the film in under budget, wrapping in February 2006. The film took 115 days to shoot.

Some of the cast was not happy with Fincher's exacting ways and perfectionism. Some scenes required upward of 70 takes. Gyllenhaal was frustrated by the director's methods and commented in an interview, "You get a take, 5 takes, 10 takes. Some places, 90 takes. But there is a stopping point. There's a point at which you go, 'That's what we have to work with.' But we would reshoot things. So there came a point where I would say, well, what do I do? Where's the risk?" Downey said, "I just decided, aside from several times I wanted to garrote him, that I was going to give him what he wanted. I think I'm a perfect person to work for him, because I understand gulags". Fincher responded, "If an actor is going to let the role come to them, they can't resent the fact that I'm willing to wait as long as that takes. You know, the first day of production in San Francisco we shot 56 takes of Mark and Jake – and it's the 56th take that's in the movie". Ruffalo also defended his director's methods when he said, "The way I see it is, you enter into someone else's world as an actor. You can put your expectations aside and have an experience that's new and pushes and changes you, or hold on to what you think it should be and have a stubborn, immovable journey that's filled with disappointment and anger."

Visual effects

Digital Domain handled most of the film's 200+ effects shots, including pools of blood and bloody fingerprints found at crime scenes. For the murder of Cecelia Shepard at Lake Berryessa, blood seepage and clothing stains were added in post-production. Fincher did not want to shoot the blood with practical effects because cleaning the costumes after every take would take too long, so the murder sequences were done with computer-generated (CG) blood.

CG was also used to recreate the San Francisco neighborhood at Washington and Cherry Streets where cab driver Paul Stine was killed. The area had changed significantly over the years and residents did not want the murder to be recreated in their neighborhood, so Fincher shot the sequence on a bluescreen stage. Production designer Donald Burt gave the visual effects team detailed drawings of the intersection as it was in 1969. Photographs of every possible angle of the area were shot with a high-resolution digital camera, allowing the effects crew to build computer-based geometric models of homes that were then textured with period facades. 3D vintage police motorcycles, squad cars, a firetruck and street lights were added to the final shot.

Several of the film's establishing shots of the 1970s-era Bay Area were created by the Marin County effects house Matte World Digital (MWD). The "helicopter shots" of the fireworks-laden sky over Vallejo, the San Francisco waterfront, and the overhead shot of the cab driving through San Francisco were CG, as was the shot looking down at traffic from the tower of the Golden Gate Bridge. A time-lapse sequence of the construction of the Transamerica Pyramid was a hybrid of 2D and 3D matte painting, created using reference photos of the Pyramid taken from the rooftop of Francis Ford Coppola's Sentinel Building. MWD visual effects supervisor Craig Barron researched the Pyramid's construction for accuracy.

Soundtrack
Originally, Fincher envisioned the film's soundtrack to be composed of 40 cues of vintage music spanning the nearly three decades of the Zodiac story. Fincher and music supervisor George Drakoulias searched for pop songs that reflected the era, including Three Dog Night's cover of "Easy to Be Hard".

Fincher did not plan an original score for the film, but rather a tapestry of sound design, vintage songs of the period, sound bites and clips of KFRC and advertisements for "Mathews Top of the Hill Daly City" (a prominent local consumer electronics dealership of the time). He told the studio that he did not need a composer and would purchase various songs instead. They agreed, but as the film developed, sound designer Ren Klyce felt there were some scenes that could have used music. Klyce inserted music from one of his favorite soundtracks, David Shire's score for The Conversation.

Klyce contacted film and sound editor Walter Murch who worked on The Conversation, and he connected Klyce with Shire. Fincher sent Shire a copy of the script and flew him in to Los Angeles for a meeting. Fincher only wanted 15–20 minutes of score and based solely on piano. Shire worked on it and incorporated textures of a Charles Ives piece called "The Unanswered Question" and Conversation-based cues, he found that he had 37 minutes of original music. The orchestra Shire assembled consisted of musicians from the San Francisco Opera and San Francisco Ballet. Shire said, "There are 12 signs of the Zodiac and there is a way of using atonal and tonal music. So we used 12 tones, never repeating any of them but manipulating them". He used specific instruments to represent the characters: the trumpet for Toschi, the solo piano for Graysmith and the dissonant strings for the Zodiac killer.

Release
An early version of Zodiac ran three hours and eight minutes. It was supposed to be released in time for Academy Award consideration but Paramount felt that the film ran too long and asked Fincher to make changes. Contractually, he had final cut and once he reached a length he felt was right, the director refused to make any further cuts. To trim down the film to its official runtime, he had to cut a two-minute blackout montage of "hit songs signaling the passage of time from Joni Mitchell to Donna Summer." It was replaced with a title card that reads, "Four years later." Another cut scene that test screening audiences did not like involved "three guys talking into a speakerphone" to get a search warrant as Toschi and Armstrong talk to SFPD Capt. Marty Lee (Dermot Mulroney) about their case against suspect Arthur Leigh Allen. Fincher said that this scene would probably be put back on the DVD.

To promote Zodiac, Paramount posted on light-poles in major cities original sketches of the actual Zodiac killer with the words, "In theaters March 2nd," at the bottom. The film was screened in competition at the 2007 Cannes Film Festival on May 17, 2007, with Fincher and Gyllenhaal participating in a press conference afterwards. The director's cut of Zodiac was given a rare screening at the Walter Reade Theater in New York City on November 19, 2007, with Fincher being interviewed by film critic Kent Jones afterwards.

Home media
The DVD for Zodiac was released on July 24, 2007, and is available widescreen or fullscreen, presented in anamorphic widescreen, and an English Dolby Digital 5.1 Surround track. The initial DVD version of Zodiac contained only a few special features. According to producer David Prior, Fincher agreed to release it as Prior needed more time to prepare bonus material. In its first week, rentals for the DVD earned $6.7 million.

The two-disc director's cut DVD and HD DVD were released on January 8, 2008, with its UK release on Blu-ray and DVD announced for September 29, 2008. Disc 1 contains, in addition to a longer cut of the film, audio commentaries by Fincher and Gyllenhaal, Downey, Fischer, Vanderbilt, and author James Ellroy. Disc 2 includes a trailer, a "Zodiac Deciphered" documentary, previsualization split-screen comparisons for the Blue Rock Springs, Lake Berryessa, and San Francisco murder sequences, and three video features: "Visual Effects of Zodiac", "This is the Zodiac Speaking", and a "His Name Was Arthur Leigh Allen". Other extras originally intended for the set, including TV spots and features on "Digital Workflow", "Linguistic Analysis", "Jeopardy Surface: Geographic Profiling" (Dr. Kim Rossmo's geographic profile of the Zodiac), and "The Psychology of Aggression: Behavioral Profiling" (Special Agent Sharon Pagaling-Hagan's behavioral profile of the Zodiac) were omitted. However, the latter three features were made available on the film's website.

For Academy Awards contention, Paramount distributed the director's cut DVD to the Producers Guild of America, the Writers Guild of America and the Screen Actors Guild, instead of the official release version; the first time that the studio had done this.

Reception

Box office
Opening in 2,362 theaters on March 2, 2007, the film grossed US$13.3 million in its opening weekend, placing second and posting a per-theater average of $5,671. The film was outgrossed by fellow opener Wild Hogs and saw a decline of over 50% in its second weekend, losing out to the record-breaking 300. It grossed $33 million in North America and $51 million in the rest of the world, bringing its current total to $84 million. In an interview with Sight & Sound magazine, Fincher addressed the film's low gross at the North American box office: "Even with the box office being what it is, I still think there's an audience out there for this movie. Everyone has a different idea about marketing, but my philosophy is that if you market a movie to 16-year-old boys and don't deliver Saw or Seven, they're going to be the most vociferous ones coming out of the screening saying 'This movie sucks.' And you're saying goodbye to the audience who would get it because they're going to look at the ads and say, 'I don't want to see some slasher movie.'"

Critical response
On review aggregator Rotten Tomatoes, the film holds an approval rating of 90% based on 261 reviews, with an average rating of 7.70/10. The site's critical consensus reads: "A quiet, dialogue-driven thriller that delivers with scene after scene of gut-wrenching anxiety. David Fincher also spends more time illustrating nuances of his characters and recreating the mood of the 70s than he does on gory details of murder." At Metacritic, the film has a weighted average score of 78 out of 100, based on 40 critics, indicating "generally favorable reviews". Audiences polled by CinemaScore gave the film an average grade of "B−" on an A+ to F scale.

Entertainment Weekly critic Owen Gleiberman awarded the film an "A" grade, hailing the film as a "procedural thriller for the information age" that "spins your head in a new way, luring you into a vortex and then deeper still." Nathan Lee in his review for The Village Voice wrote that director Fincher's "very lack of pretense, coupled with a determination to get the facts down with maximum economy and objectivity, gives Zodiac its hard, bright integrity. As a crime saga, newspaper drama, and period piece, it works just fine. As an allegory of life in the information age, it blew my mind." Todd McCarthy's review in Variety magazine praised the film's "almost unerringly accurate evocation of the workaday San Francisco of 35–40 years ago. Forget the distorted emphasis on hippies and flower-power that many such films indulge in: this is the city as it was experienced by most people who lived and worked there." David Ansen, in his review for Newsweek magazine, wrote, "Zodiac is meticulously crafted – Harris Savides's state-of-the-art digital cinematography has a richness indistinguishable from film – and it runs almost two hours and 40 minutes. Still, the movie holds you in its grip from start to finish. Fincher boldly (and some may think perversely) withholds the emotional and forensic payoff we're conditioned to expect from a big studio movie." Roger Ebert gave the film a maximum of 4 stars, writing: "The film is a police procedural crossed with a newspaper movie but free of most of the cliches of either. Its most impressive accomplishment is to gather a bewildering labyrinth of facts and suspicions over a period of years and make the journey through this maze frightening and suspenseful." Ebert also praised the ensemble cast and, as a longtime columnist for The Chicago Sun-Times, asserted Zodiac was "intriguing in its accuracy" in showing the operation of a major newspaper.

Time Out magazine wrote, "Zodiac isn't a puzzle film in quite that way, instead its subject is the compulsion to solve puzzles and its coup is the creeping recognition, quite contrary to the flow of crime cinema, of how fruitless that compulsion can be." Peter Bradshaw in his review for The Guardian commended the film for its "sheer cinematic virility," and gave it four stars out of five. In his review for Empire magazine, Kim Newman gave the film 4 out of 5 stars and wrote, "You'll need patience with the film's approach, which follows its main characters by poring over details, and be prepared to put up with a couple of rote family arguments and weary cop conversations, but this gripping character study becomes more agonisingly suspenseful as it gets closer to an answer that can't be confirmed." Graham Fuller in Sight & Sound magazine wrote, "the tone is pleasingly flat and mundane, evoking the demoralising grind of police work in a pre-feminist, pre-technological era. As such, Zodiac is considerably more adult than both Seven, which salivates over the macabre cat-and-mouse game it plays with the audience, and the macho brinkmanship of Fight Club."

Some critics expressed disappointment with the film's long running time and lack of action scenes. "The film gets mired in the inevitable red tape of police investigations," wrote Bob Longino of The Atlanta Journal-Constitution, who also felt the film "stumbles to a rather unfulfilling conclusion" and "seems to last as long as the Oscars." Andrew Sarris of The New York Observer felt that "Mr. Fincher's flair for casting is the major asset of his curiously attenuated return to the serial-killer genre. I keep saying 'curiously' with regard to Mr. Fincher, because I can't really figure out what he is up to in Zodiac – with its two-hour-and-37-minute running time for what struck me as a shaggy-dog narrative." Christy Lemire wrote in the San Francisco Chronicle that "Jake Gyllenhaal is both the central figure and the weakest link... But he's never fleshed out sufficiently to make you believe that he'd sacrifice his safety and that of his family to find the truth. We are told repeatedly that the former Eagle Scout is just a genuinely good guy but that's not enough." David Thompson of The Guardian felt that in relation to the rest of Fincher's career, Zodiac was "the worst yet, a terrible disappointment in which an ingenious and deserving all-American serial killer nearly gets lost in the meandering treatment of cops and journalists obsessed with the case."

In France, Le Monde newspaper praised Fincher for having "obtained a maturity that impresses by his mastery of form," while Libération described the film as "a thriller of elegance magnificently photographed by the great Harry Savides." However, Le Figaro wrote, "No audacity, no invention, nothing but a plot which intrigues without captivating, disturbs without terrifying, interests without exciting."

Top ten lists
Only two 2007 films (No Country for Old Men and There Will Be Blood) appeared on more critics' top ten lists than Zodiac. Some of the notable top-ten list appearances are:

In the British Film Institute's 2012 Sight & Sound polls of the greatest movies ever made, three critics and one director, Bong Joon-ho, named Zodiac one of their 10 favorite films. In a 2016 critics' poll conducted by the BBC, Zodiac was ranked at 12th place in a list of the 21st century's greatest films.

Accolades

See also
 List of films based on crime books

References

Further reading
 Film & Video: VFX for Zodiac
 San Francisco Chronicle set visit
 Building Suspense Along the Trail of an Invisible Man - an analysis of a scene from the film
 David Fincher's Zodiac: Cinema of Investigation and (Mis)Interpretation, edited by Matthew Sorrento and David Ryan (Fairleigh Dickinson University Press, 2022).

External links

 
 
 
 
 

2007 drama films
2007 films
2000s crime drama films
2000s English-language films
2000s mystery thriller films
2000s serial killer films
American crime drama films
American docudrama films
American films based on actual events
American mystery thriller films
American police detective films
American serial killer films
Crime films based on actual events
Cryptography in fiction
Cultural depictions of the Zodiac Killer
Films about journalists
Films about real serial killers
Films based on non-fiction books
Films directed by David Fincher
Films produced by James Vanderbilt
Films scored by David Shire
Films set in 1969
Films set in 1971
Films set in 1978
Films set in 1983
Films set in 1991
Films set in a movie theatre
Films set in San Francisco
Films set in the San Francisco Bay Area
Films shot in San Francisco
Films with screenplays by James Vanderbilt
Paramount Pictures films
Phoenix Pictures films
Thriller films based on actual events
True crime
Warner Bros. films
2000s American films